Chappidolla Gudem is a village of Choutuppal mandal in the Nalgonda district in Telangana. It falls under Munugodu assembly and Bhongir parliament constitution.

rapidly 

Concerns:  These village's ground water is rapidly polluting by surrounded pharma companies like Prathista Industries Limited and other Pharama Companies.

References
Census of India 2001: Data from the 2001 Census

Villages in Nalgonda district